Stoholm is a railway town in Viborg Municipality, Denmark, located 15 km southeast of Skive, 28 km north of Karup and 18 km west of Viborg.

Stoholm was the municipal seat of the now abolished Fjends Municipality.

Transportation 
Stoholm is located at the Langå-Struer railway line and is served by Stoholm railway station.

References

Cities and towns in the Central Denmark Region
Viborg Municipality